Events in 1978 in animation.

Events

March 
 March 1: Karel Zeman's Krabat – The Sorcerer's Apprentice premieres.
 March 11: Masami Hata's Chirin no Suzu (Ringing Bell) premieres, the first animated feature produced by Sanrio to be aimed more at young adults with a remarkable tone shift in the second half of the film.
 March 27: Jannik Hastrup's Danish animated feature The Thralls is first released in theaters.

April 
 April 2: The first episode of Starzinger premieres.
 April 3: 50th Academy Awards: The Sand Castle by Co Hoedeman wins the Academy Award for Best Animated Short.

May 
 May 12: Hisayuki Toriumi's Science Ninja Team Gatchaman: The Movie premieres.
 May 16–30: Jean-François Laguionie's Rowing Across the Atlantic premieres during the 1978 Cannes Film Festival. It will later win a Short Film Palme d'Or.

June 
 June 3: The first episode of Haikara-San: Here Comes Miss Modern airs.
 June 16: The film Grease premieres which has an animated opening sequence created by John David Wilson.
 June 23: Lionel Jeffries' The Water Babies which combines animation and live-action, is first released.

July 
 July 6: The first episode of Wattoo Wattoo Super Bird airs.
 July 14: Leiji Matsumoto's Farewell to Space Battleship Yamato is first released.

September 
 The first episode of Quaq Quao airs.
 September 30: The first episode of Il était une fois... l'Homme (Once Upon a Time... Man), the first series in the Once Upon a Time... franchise by Albert Barillé, airs.

October 
 October 19: Martin Rosen's animated feature film, Watership Down, an adaptation of Richard Adams' novel Watership Down, premieres.
 October 22: Nelvana releases its first animated Halloween special, The Devil and Daniel Mouse.
 October 24: René Goscinny and Morris' second animated feature film based on the Lucky Luke series, La Ballade des Dalton, premieres in France.

November 
 November 2: Takashi Masunaga's anthology film Metamorphoses premieres, a retelling of Metamorphoses by Roman poet Ovid set to music by Joan Baez and Mick Jagger.
 November 6: Eunice Macaulay and John Weldon's Livraison Spéciale (Special Delivery) is first released.
 November 13: To celebrate the character's 50th anniversary, Mickey Mouse receives a star at the Hollywood Walk of Fame. He is the first animated character and general fictional character to receive this honor.
 November 15: Ralph Bakshi releases his animated film adaptation of the Ring trilogy by J. R. R. Tolkien: The Lord of the Rings.

December 
 December 16:
 Soji Yoshikawa's The Mystery of Mamo is first released, the first animated film in the Lupin III franchise.
 Don Bluth's The Small One is first released, produced by Walt Disney Productions.

Specific date unknown 
 Ishu Patel's animated short Afterlife premieres.
 Robert Awad, André Leduc and Tim Reid's L'Affaire Bronswik (The Bronswik Affair) premieres, an animated mockumentary.
 Yefim Gamburg's Ograblenie po... (Robbery Style...) premieres.
 Janet Perlman and Derek Lamb's Why Me? premieres.

Films released 

 January 23 - Kongjui & Patchui (South Korea)
 March 10 - The Ballad of the Daltons (France)
 March 11 - Ringing Bell (Japan)
 March 18 - Thumbelina (Japan)
 March 27 - The Thralls (Denmark)
 April - Proszę słonia (Poland)
 May 3 - Metamorphoses (Japan and United States)
 May 12 - Science Ninja Team Gatchaman: The Movie (Japan)
 May 15 - Wilhelm Busch – Die Trickfilm-Parade: Max und Moritz und andere Streiche (Germany)
 June 23 - The Water Babies (United Kingdom)
 June 30 - Mickey Mouse Jubilee Show (United States)
 July 14 - Farewell to Space Battleship Yamato: Warriors of Love (Japan)
 July 23 - 77 Group's Secret (South Korea)
 July 26 - Robot Taekwon V vs. Golden Wings Showdown (South Korea)
 July 31 - Run, Wonder Princess! (South Korea)
 August 19 - The Phoenix (Japan)
 August 27 - One Million-Year Trip: Bander Book (Japan)
 September 23 - King Fang (Japan)
 October 19 - Watership Down (United Kingdom and United States)
 October 28 - Black Beauty (United States)
 November 2 - Twelve Days of Christmas (United States)
 November 4 - Los Supersabios (Mexico)
 November 15 - The Lord of the Rings (United States)
 November 25 - Not Everything that Flies is a Bird (Germany and Yugoslavia)
 December 16 - Lupin III: The Mystery of Mamo (Japan)
 December 23 - The Stingiest Man in Town (United States and Japan)
 December 26 - The Talking Parcel (United Kingdom) 
 December 31 - Captain Future: The Great Race in the Solar System (Japan)
 Specific date unknown: 
 Dallyeora Majingga X (South Korea)
 Fantasia's Attic (Spain)
 Ferda the Ant. How Ferda Lived in the World and Stories about his Friend Little Back (Czechoslovakia and Soviet Union)
 General Ttoli (South Korea)
 Gold Wing 123 (South Korea)
 The Magic Flute (Italy and Australia)
 Sonogonggwa byeoldeurui-ro jeonjaeng (South Korea)
 Xigua pao (China)

Television series 

 January 1 - Perrine Monogatari debuts on Fuji TV and Sat.1.
 March 6 - Majokko Tickle debuts on TV Asahi.
 March 14 - Space Pirate Captain Harlock debuts on TV Asahi.
 April 1 - Tosho Daimos debuts on TV Asahi.
 April 2 - Starzinger debuts on Fuji TV.
 April 4 - Future Boy Conan debuts on NHK General TV.
 April 10 - Highschool Baseball Ninja debuts on Fuji TV.
 June 3: 
 Haikara-san ga Tōru debuts on TV Asahi.
 Invincible Steel Man Daitarn 3 debuts on Nagoya TV.
 July 4 - The Adventures of The Little Prince debuts on TV Asahi.
 July 6 - Wattoo Wattoo Super Bird debuts on A2.
 September - Quaq Quao debuts in syndication.
 September 9:
 Buford and the Galloping Ghost debuts on NBC.
 Challenge of the Super Friends and Fangface debut on ABC.
 Crazylegs Crane, Dinky Dog, Manta and Moray, Superstretch and Microwoman, Tarzan and the Super 7, The All-New Popeye Hour, The Freedom Force , and Web Woman debut on CBS.
 Fabulous Funnies, Galaxy Goof-Ups, The Godzilla Power Hour, Jana of the Jungle, The Buford Files, The Galloping Ghost, The New Fantastic Four, and Yogi's Space Race debut on NBC.
 September 12 - Battle of the Planets debuts in syndication.
 September 14 - Galaxy Express 999 debuts on Fuji TV.
 September 30 - Once Upon a Time... Man debuts on FR3.
 October 1 - Gatchaman II debuts on Fuji TV.
 October 8 - Treasure Island debuts on NTV.
 October 14 - Space Battleship Yamato 2 debuts on Yomiuri TV.
 November 7 - Captain Future debuts on NHK General TV.

Births

January
 January 1: Jose Garibaldi, American animator (Good Vibes, Electric City, The Epic Tales of Captain Underpants, The Lego Movie 2: The Second Part), illustrator and character designer (Teenage Mutant Ninja Turtles).
 January 8: Scott Whyte, American actor (voice of Uncle Andrew and Porcupunk in Power Players, Sparrow in the Miraculous: Tales of Ladybug & Cat Noir episode "Miraculous World: New York – United Heroez").
 January 9: AJ McLean, American musician and member of the Backstreet Boys (voice of Kuchimba in The Lion Guard episode "The Underground Adventure", himself in the Arthur episode "Arthur, It's Only Rock and Roll" and the Static Shock episode "Duped").
 January 24: Kristen Schaal, American actress and comedian (voice of Mabel Pines in Gravity Falls, Louise Belcher in Bob's Burgers, Trixie in Toy Story 3 and Toy Story 4, Sarah Lynn in BoJack Horseman, Barb in Cloudy with a Chance of Meatballs 2, Shannon in Despicable Me 2, herself in the Scooby-Doo and Guess Who? episode "The Horrible Haunted Hospital of Dr. Phineas Phrag!").
 January 25: Volodymyr Zelenskyy, Ukrainian politician and former actor (dub voice of Paddington Bear in Paddington and Paddington 2).
 January 28: Mark Hildreth, Canadian actor (voice of Milton Dyer in Ninjago, Vert Wheeler in Hot Wheels Battle Force 5, Quicksilver in Wolverine and the X-Men, Pan in Class of the Titans, Thundermutt in Krypto the Superdog, Angel in X-Men: Evolution, Heero Yuy in Mobile Suit Gundam Wing, Sir Gallop and Sir Zeke in King Arthur and the Knights of Justice, Deathlok in the Hulk and the Agents of S.M.A.S.H. episode "Deathlok").

February
 February 2: Eden Espinosa, American actress (voice of Cassandra in Rapunzel's Tangled Adventure, Queen of Hearts in Alice's Wonderland Bakery).
 February 3: Eliza Jane Schneider, American actress, singer, playwright, and dialect coach (portrayed Liza in Beakman's World, voice of various characters in Popzilla, Sweet Older Lady in Foodfight!, Chido's Mom in Sanjay and Craig, Lola in the Johnny Bravo episode "Berry the Butler", Charisse in the King of the Hill episode "I'm with Cupid", Jenny in The Zeta Project episode "The Wrong Morph", Moofy in the Invader Zim episode "The Girl Who Cried Gnome", Martha in the Squirrel Boy episode "Diss and Make Up", Ewok Nerd in The Cleveland Show episode "Hot Cocoa Bang Bang", Baroness von Gunther and Georgette Taylor in the Batman: The Brave and the Bold episode "The Scorn of the Star Sapphire!", continued voice of Liane Cartman, Wendy Testaburger, Sheila Broflovski, Shelly Marsh, Sharon Marsh, Mrs. Crabtree, Principal Victoria, and other various characters in South Park).
 February 7: Matt Warburton, American television writer and producer (The Simpsons).
 February 21: Nicole Parker, American actress (voice of Penelope Pitstop in Wacky Races, Siobhan in Bunnicula).

March
 March 1:
 Donovan Patton, American actor and television host (portrayed Joe in Blue's Clues and Blue's Clues & You!, voice of Daniel in Maya & Miguel, Bot in Team Umizoomi, Mr. Reese in Clarence, Chef Zesty in Creative Galaxy, Catrat in Gabby's Dollhouse, Hector Hare in The Tom and Jerry Show episode "The Tortoise Don't Play Fair", Luster Dock in the Sunny Day episode "Blair's Appointment", additional voices in Monsters University and We Bare Bears).
 Jensen Ackles, American actor (voice of Batman in Batman: The Long Halloween, Jason Todd in Batman: Under the Red Hood).
 March 17: Patrick Seitz, American actor (voice of Dio Brando in JoJo's Bizarre Adventure, Enji Todoroki / Endeavor in My Hero Academia, Kunikida Doppo in Bungo Stray Dogs, Kenpachi Zaraki and Isshin Kurosaki in Bleach, Laxus Dreyar in Fairy Tail, Agil in Sword Art Online, Kunzite in the Viz Media dub of Sailor Moon, Thor in Marvel Future Avengers, Etrigan in Justice League Action, Mumm-Ra and Tygra in ThunderCats Roar).
 March 23: Nicholle Tom, American actress (voice of Supergirl in the DC Animated Universe).
 March 25: Tomohisa Shimoyama, Japanese director (Super Shiro) and animator (Fullmetal Alchemist: The Sacred Star of Milos, The Night Is Short, Walk On Girl).

April
 April 20: C. Raggio IV, American animator (Camp Lazlo, The Marvelous Misadventures of Flapjack), character designer (The Marvelous Misadventures of Flapjack, The Powerpuff Girls, The Mighty B!, Disney Television Animation) and storyboard artist (The Replacements, Illumination, The Angry Birds Movie 2), (d. 2019).

May 
 May 2: Kumail Nanjiani, Pakistani-American actor and comedian (voice of Jay in The Lego Ninjago Movie, Prismo in Adventure Time).
 May 4: Daisuke Ono, Japanese voice actor (voice of Erwin Smith in Attack on Titan, Jotaro Kujo in JoJo's Bizarre Adventure, Sebastian Michaelis in Black Butler, Leon in Pokémon, Japanese dub voice of Nod in Epic, Guy in The Croods, and Prince Gumball in Adventure Time).
 May 10: Kenan Thompson, American actor and comedian (voiced and portrayed the title character in Fat Albert, voice of Greedy Smurf in The Smurfs and The Smurfs 2, Riff in Rock Dog, Bricklebaum in The Grinch, Gus in Wonder Park, Bloodbones in Playmobil: The Movie, Tiny Diamond in the Trolls franchise, Rocky Rhodes in The Mighty B!, Sue Sezno in Sit Down, Shut Up, Ronald in Nature Cat, himself in the Scooby-Doo and Guess Who? episode "Quit Clowning!").
 May 15: David Krumholtz, American actor (voice of Kareem Lavash in Sausage Party, Timo in All Hail King Julien, Cobalt Ferrero in the Star vs. the Forces of Evil episode "Marco Jr.").
 May 22: Ginnifer Goodwin, American actress (voice of Judy Hopps in Zootopia, Fawn in Tinker Bell and the Legend of the NeverBeast, Gwen in the Sofia the First episode "Gizmo Gwen").

June
 June 5: Nick Kroll, American actor, comedian, writer and producer (voice of Stu in The Life & Times of Tim, Andrew LeGustambos in Sit Down, Shut Up, Reuben Grinder in WordGirl, Andy Dick, Student, Dry Cleaner, Costgo Employee and Henry Watkins Jr. in American Dad!, Douche in Sausage Party, Gunter in Sing and Sing 2, Professor Poopypants in Captain Underpants: The First Epic Movie, Mr. Desanto in Bob's Burgers, Sergei in The Secret Life of Pets 2, Uncle Fester in The Addams Family and The Addams Family 2, Scary Carnie in The Bob's Burgers Movie, Ricky in the Family Guy episode "Into Harmony's Way", Lem in The Simpsons episode "Halloween of Horror", Cleb in the SuperMansion episode "Babes in the Wood", Jerry in the Animals episode "Pigeons.", co-creator and voice of Nick Birch, Maury the Hormone Monster, Lola Skumpy, Coach Steve Steve and other various characters in Big Mouth, Rick and Todd in Human Resources).
 June 6:
 Judith Barsi, American child actress (voice of Ducky in The Land Before Time, Anne-Marie in All Dogs Go to Heaven), (d. 1988).
 Dave King, American television producer and writer (The Simpsons, Santa Inc.).
 June 7: Bill Hader, American actor and comedian (voice of Fear in Inside Out, Flint Lockwood in Cloudy with a Chance of Meatballs and Cloudy with a Chance of Meatballs 2, Leonard in The Angry Birds Movie and The Angry Birds Movie 2, Spamley in Ralph Breaks the Internet, Guy Gagne in Turbo).
 June 13: Ethan Embry, American actor (voice of Electro in Spider-Man: The New Animated Series, Melampus in Hercules, Bodhi in The Zeta Project episode "His Maker's Name").
 June 18:
 Tara Platt, American actress (voice of Ikuko Tsukino in Sailor Moon, Temari in Naruto, Reina in Rave Master, Kali Belladonna in RWBY, Washimi in Aggretsuko, Jennifer Nocturne, Ester, and Subdora in the Ben 10 franchise).
 Ben Gleib, American actor and comedian (voice of Marshall in Ice Age: Continental Drift, Goya and Dali in The Book of Life, NewsGroup in Jay & Silent Bob's Super Groovy Cartoon Movie).
June 19: Zoe Saldaña, American actress (voice of Captain Celaeno in My Little Pony: The Movie, Maya in Maya and the Three, Adelina Fortnight in Missing Link, Maria Posada in The Book of Life).

July
 July 6:
 Tia Mowry, American actress (voice of Sasha in the Bratz franchise, Lemonjella LaBelle in Detention, Sindy Sauernotes in Fresh Beat Band of Spies).
 Tamera Mowry, American actress (voice of Orangejella LaBelle in Detention, Emma Squared in The Adventures of Hyperman, Esther in Family Guy).   
 
 July 8: Tony Mines, English animator, writer, director and producer (The Lego Group, co-founder of Spite Your Face Productions), (d. 2022).
 July 19:
 R.J. Williams, American actor (voice of the title character in Kissyfur, Kit Cloudkicker in TaleSpin, Cavin in season 6 of Adventures of the Gummi Bears).
 Chiara Zanni, Canadian actress (voice of Alex in Camp Candy, Jubilee in X-Men: Evolution, the title character in Hamtaro, Molly in Oban Star-Racers, Petunia Pig in Baby Looney Tunes, Fiona Munson in Kid vs. Kat, Daring Do in My Little Pony: Friendship Is Magic, Colby in Henry Hugglemonster).

August
 August 3: Tommy Dewey, American actor, producer, and writer (voice of Stu Pickles in Rugrats).
 August 14: Neil Newbon, English actor (voice of Petra Fortis in Kingsglaive: Final Fantasy XV, Tank Driver in Jackboots on Whitehall).
 August 18: Andy Samberg, American actor and comedian (voice of Johnny in the Hotel Transylvania franchise, Brent McHale in the Cloudy with a Chance of Meatballs franchise, Benedict Arnold in America: The Motion Picture, Dale in Chip 'n Dale: Rescue Rangers).
 August 21: Christopher Willis, Australian-born English composer (Disney Television Animation).
 August 22: James Corden, English actor and comedian (voice of Biggie in the Trolls franchise, Hi-5 in The Emoji Movie, Vernkot in Planet 51, Percy in Smallfoot).
 August 23: Kobe Bryant, American professional basketball player (wrote and narrated Dear Basketball, voiced himself in The Proud Family episode "One in a Million"), (d. 2020).
 August 28: Rachel Kimsey, American actress (voice of Wonder Woman in Justice League Action and the Scooby-Doo and Guess Who? episode "The Scooby of a Thousand Faces!").
 August 31: Mike Erwin, American actor (voice of Strikemaster Ice in Jackie Chan Adventures, Roy Harper in Teen Titans and the Justice League Unlimited episode "Patriot Act").

October
 October 4: 
 Dana Davis, American actress and novelist (voice of Claire in Motorcity, Kelly in Star vs. the Forces of Evil, Kit in Craig of the Creek, Lonnie in She-Ra and the Princesses of Power, Jess in Amphibia).
 Phillip Glasser, American former actor (voice of Fievel Mousekewitz in An American Tail and An American Tail: Fievel Goes West).
 October 7: Omar Benson Miller, American actor (voice of Raphael in Rise of the Teenage Mutant Ninja Turtles and Rise of the Teenage Mutant Ninja Turtles: The Movie, Randy Carmichael in Rugrats).

November
 November 6: Nicole Dubuc, American actress (voice of Iris West-Allen in Young Justice, Nuala in Miles from Tomorrowland, Honey in The Rocketeer), and writer (Transformers, My Little Pony: Friendship is Magic).
 November 16:
 Vyvan Pham, American actress (voice of Julie Yamamoto in the Ben 10 franchise, Cricket in Generator Rex, Ullu in The Lion Guard, Katana in the Batman: The Brave and the Bold episode "Enter the Outsiders!").
 Cal Brunker, Canadian animator (Looney Tunes: Back in Action, Cyberchase, Kronk's New Groove), storyboard artist (Blue Sky Studios, Illumination, 9, Spliced, Ratchet & Clank), screenwriter (Arctic Dogs, Bigfoot Family) and film director (Escape from Planet Earth, The Nut Job 2: Nutty by Nature, PAW Patrol: The Movie).
 November 19:
 Daniel Chong, American animator and producer (Pixar, creator of We Bare Bears).
 Chad Doreck, American actor (voice of Brad in My Life as a Teenage Robot, Centola in the Rocket Power episode "Reggie's Big (Beach) Break").
 November 30: Gael Garcia Bernal, Mexican actor and producer (voice of Héctor in Coco).

December
 December 17: Cav Bøgelund, Danish animator and comics artist (Våbenbrødre), (d. 2018).
 December 27: Colin Heck, American animator (Film Roman, Futurama, Neighbors from Hell), storyboard artist (Nickelodeon Animation Studio, Harvey Birdman, Attorney at Law, Teen Titans, The Simpsons, Family Guy, American Dad!, Drawn Together, The Simpsons Movie, Futurama, Batman: The Brave and the Bold, Neighbors from Hell, Chicago Party Aunt), character designer (American Dad!), writer (Harvey Beaks) and director (Allen Gregory, The Legend of Korra, Ben 10, Harley Quinn).

Specific date unknown 
 Alessandro Carloni, Italian film director, animator, and art director (Dreamworks Animation).
 Dave Creek, American animator (Happiness Is a Warm Blanket, Charlie Brown) and character designer (Bob's Burgers, Brickleberry, Central Park, The Great North), (d. 2021).

Deaths

January 
 January 18:
 Clark Haas, American comics artist, animator and animation producer (Clutch Cargo, Hanna-Barbera), dies at age 58.
 Junius Matthews, American actor (voice of Archimedes in The Sword in the Stone, Rabbit in the Winnie the Pooh franchise), dies at age 87.

February 
 February 9: Woody Gelman, American animator, comics artist, novelist and publisher (worked for Fleischer Studios and Famous Studios), dies of a stroke at age 62.
 February 28: Dorothy Jones, American screenwriter and wife of Chuck Jones (Gay Purr-ee), dies at age 70.

April 
 April 3: Winston Sharples, American composer (Van Beuren Studios, Fleischer Studios, Famous Studios), dies at age 69.
 April 19: Joe Dougherty, American actor (original voice of Porky Pig), dies at age 79.
 April 21:Thelma Boardman, American actress (voice of Minnie Mouse from 1937 to 1938, and 1941 to 1942), dies at age 68.

June 
 June 1: John W. Burton, American film producer (head of Warner Bros. Cartoons from 1958 to 1960) and cinematographer, dies at age 71.

July
July 26: Mary Blair, American artist, animator and designer (The Walt Disney Company), dies at age 66.

August 
 August 22: Steve Gravers, American actor (voice of Blackwolf in Wizards), dies at age 56 from lung cancer.
 August 24: Louis Prima, American jazz musician and actor (voice of King Louie in The Jungle Book), dies at age 67.

September 
 September 30: Edgar Bergen, American actor, comedian and puppeteer (narrator in the Mickey and the Beanstalk segment in Fun and Fancy Free), dies at age 75.

October 
 October 8: Karl Swenson, American actor (voice of Merlin in The Sword in the Stone), dies at age 70.
 October 10: J.R. Bray, American animator, film producer and director (Colonel Heeza Liar), dies at age 99.

November 
 November 20: Tom Okamoto, Japanese-American animator and comics artist (Walt Disney Animation Studios), dies at age 62.

December 
 December 4: Brian Lewis, British illustrator, comics artist and animator (Yellow Submarine), dies at age 49.
 December 28: Władysław Nehrebecki, Polish animator and television director (Bolek and Lolek), dies at age 55.

See also 
 1978 in anime

Sources

External links 
 Animated works of the year, listed in the IMDb

 
1970s in animation